Trachelochismus is a genus of clingfishes endemic to the shores of New Zealand, with currently three recognized species:
 Trachelochismus aestuarium Conway, Stewart & King 2017
 Trachelochismus melobesia Phillipps, 1927 (striped clingfish)
 Trachelochismus pinnulatus (J. R. Forster, 1801)

References

 
Marine fish genera
Taxa named by Charles N. F. Brisout